Chenar-e Olya may refer to:
 Chenar-e Olya, Hamadan
 Chenar-e Olya, Kermanshah
 Chenar-e Olya, Lorestan